We're No Angels or We Are No Angels may refer to:

We're No Angels (1955 film), a 1955 film starring Humphrey Bogart
We Are No Angels (1975 film), a 1975 film starring Michael Coby and Paul L. Smith
We're No Angels (1989 film), a 1989 film starring Robert De Niro and Sean Penn
"We're No Angels", a 1988 song by John Farnham, later covered by Tina Arena